Amhi Asu Laadke is a Marathi film released on 14 December 2005.

Cast 
The film stars Neena Kulkarni, Dr. Girish Oak, Subhodh Bhave, Jyoti Subhash, Smita Survade & Others.

Soundtrack
The music has been directed by Ashok Patki while the lyrics have been written by Suresh Bhatt.

Track listing

References

External links 
  Movie Review - knowyourfilms.com
 

2005 films
Films about disability in India
Films about the education system in India
2000s Marathi-language films